Munafiq is a 2020 Pakistani family soap television series premiered on Geo Entertainment on 27 January 2020. It is produced by Abdullah Kadwani and Asad Qureshi under 7th Sky Entertainment. The show revolves around Ujala played by Fatima Effendi, hails from middle-class background. She confronts her insecurities upon her marriage into an upper class influential family. It also features Adeel Chaudhary, Mariyam Nafees, Marina Khan and Mehmood Akhtar in pivot roles.

The show received major success; in the 7:00 PM slot and got a lot of YouTube views from Pakistan as well as India; it also trended in both countries on YouTube. It received the highest ever ratings of 7:00 pm slot in Pakistan's history, by garnering TRPs of 22 and peaking at 30.3 TRPs. The series is also available on Viu app for Middle East region.

Cast 
Fatima Effendi as Ujala, Armaan's first wife, Sabiha's daughter-in-law and Anum, Raza and Zohaib's sister
Adeel Chaudhry as Armaan, Ujala and Sobia's husband, Sabiha's only son, a politician (Dead)
Mariyam Nafees as Sobia, Armaan's second wife
Bilal Qureshi as Hamza, Armaan and Sobia's friend, Ujala's love interest
Marina Khan as Sabiha Begum, A politician, Arman's mother
Sajida Syed as Zareena, Ujala, Anum, Raza and Zohaib's mother
Sabiha Hashmi as Armaan's grandmother, Sabiha's mother-in-law (Dead)
Mehmood Akhtar as Ujala, Anum, Raza, and Zohaib's father (Dead)
Agha Talal as Zohaib, Ujala, Raza, and Anum's brother (Dead)
Hira Ahmed as Anum, Ujala, Raza and Zohaib's sister
Owais Sheikh as Raza, Ujala, Anum, and Zohaib's brother
Seemi Pasha as Shaheen, Sobia's mother
Mizna Waqas as Ramsha, Hamza's cousin
Imran Rizvi as Adeel, Ramsha's husband
Kainat Angel as Noor, Hamza's niece

References

External links 

2020 Pakistani television series debuts
Pakistani television series
2020s Pakistani television series
Urdu-language television shows
Geo TV original programming